Charles W. Thompson, who became known as Maxwell Street Jimmy Davis (March 2, 1925 – December 28, 1995) was an American electric blues singer, guitarist and songwriter. He played with John Lee Hooker, recorded an album for Elektra Records in the mid-1960s, and remained a regular street musician on Maxwell Street, in Chicago, for over 40 years. He is best remembered for his songs "Cold Hands" and "4th and Broad". He was also known as Jewtown Jimmy.

Biography
Davis was born Charles W. Thompson, in Tippo, Mississippi. In his teens, he learned to play the guitar from John Lee Hooker, and the two of them played concerts together in Detroit in the 1940s, following Davis's relocation there in 1946. Prior to his move to Detroit, he had worked in traveling minstrel shows, including the Rabbit Foot Minstrels.
Davis lived for nearly a year in Cincinnati, Ohio, before he moved to Chicago in 1953. He started performing regularly in the marketplace area of Maxwell Street, playing a traditional and electrified style of Mississippi blues.

In 1952, he recorded two songs, "Cold Hands" and "4th and Broad", under his real name, for Sun Records. They were offered to Chess Records and Bullet Records but were not released.

It is uncertain when he took the name Jimmy Davis, 
but in 1964, under that pseudonym, he recorded a couple of tracks for Testament Records. They appeared on the 1965 Testament compilation album Modern Chicago Blues. His songs were "Crying Won't Make Me Stay" and "Hanging Around My Door". The album also included a track from another Chicago street performer, John Lee Granderson, and more established artists, such as Robert Nighthawk, Big Walter Horton, and Johnny "Man" Young. The music journalist Tony Russell wrote that it was "music of great charm and honesty".
 
In 1966, Davis recorded a self-titled album for Elektra Records, which Jason Ankeny, writing for Allmusic, called "a fine showcase for his powerful guitar skills and provocative vocals". He recorded several tracks for various labels over the years, without commercial success.

Davis owned a small restaurant on Maxwell Street, the Knotty Pine Grill, and performed outside the premises in the summer. He continued to play alfresco on Chicago's West Side for decades. In July 1994, Wolf Records released the album Chicago Blues Session, Vol. 11, the tracks of which Davis had recorded in 1988 and 1989. The collection included Lester Davenport on harmonica and Kansas City Red playing the drums.

Davis died of a heart attack in December 1995, in his adopted hometown of Chicago. He was 70 years old.

A 1989 photograph of Davis performing on Maxwell Street appeared on the front cover of BluesSpeak: The Best of the Original Chicago Blues Annual, published in 2010.

Discography

Albums

Compilation albums

References

External links
 Illustrated Maxwell Street Jimmy Davis discography

1925 births
1995 deaths
American blues singers
American blues guitarists
American male guitarists
Songwriters from Mississippi
Songwriters from Illinois
Electric blues musicians
Country blues musicians
Blues musicians from Mississippi
Singers from Chicago
American street performers
Elektra Records artists
20th-century American singers
20th-century American guitarists
Guitarists from Chicago
Guitarists from Mississippi
20th-century American male singers
American male songwriters